The Uttar Pradesh Public Service Commission, commonly abbreviated as UPPSC, is Uttar Pradesh's state agency for recruitment of all the entry-level appointments to the various 
Group A and Group B Civil Services of Uttar Pradesh. The agency's charter is granted by the Constitution of India. Articles 315 to 323 of Part XIV of the constitution, titled Services Under the Union and the States, provide for a Public Service Commission for the Union and for each state.

History
The Uttar Pradesh Public Service Commission (UPPSC) came into existence on 1 April 1937, with the main aim of recruiting candidates to various services in the state. The commission  is regulated by Uttar Pradesh Public Service Commission Regulation, 1976.

Origin
Indianisation of the superior Civil Services became one of the major demands of the political movement compelling the British Indian Government to consider the setting up of a Public Service Commission for recruitment to its services in the territory. Under the Government of India Act 1935, for the first time, provision was made for the formation of Public Service Commissions at the provincial level. Uttar Pradesh Public Service Commission was constituted on 1 April 1937 with its headquarters at Allahabad.
The working of Uttar Pradesh Public Service Commission is also regulated by Uttar Pradesh Public Service Commission Regulation, 1976.

Functions of UPPSC
Recruitment of the candidates.

Promotions.
Disciplinary Actions
Service Rules.
Advice to the U.P. Government

Examination Conducted by the Commission
List of  Examinations Conducted by the U.P. Public Service Commission from time to time. (Direct recruitment through interviews only as per the service): 
Combined Competitive Examination (Civil Services)
Assistant Forest Conservator(ACF)/Forest range officer(FRO)Examinations (Natural Resource)        
R.O/A.R.O Examination (Only for the Commission) (Civil Services) 
A.P.S. Examination(Only for the Commission and secretariat of U.P. and Revenue) (Civil Services) 
Assistant Registrar Examination (Civil Services)
Combined State Engineering Examination (Engineering)        
U.P. Judicial Services (Junior Division) Examination - (PCS-J) (Law)        
Assistant Prosecuting Officers Examination (Law)        
U.P. Palika (Centralized) Health Services : Food & Sanitary Inspector Examination (Medical)        
Combined State/Lower Subordinate Examination. (Civil Services)
Combined Junior Engineer Examination (Engineering)

Controversies
On 26 September 2013, Allahabad High Court ordered UPPSC to cancel the Mains Examination of UP Provincial Civil Services (Judicial) 2013, over alleged irregularities in the Answer Key issued by it. The word key allegedly had incorrect multiple–choice options marked as correct.

On 29 March 2015, the question paper of the UPPSC PCS Preliminary exam was leaked before the exam. It led to a protest and subsequently, the cancellation of the morning shift exam. The police said that they would find the person who had sold the question paper on Whatsapp for Rs.5 Lakh per copy.

See also
 Uttar Pradesh Subordinate Services Selection Commission (UPSSSC)
 List of Public service commissions in India

References

External links 
 UPPSC Official Website
 Staff Nurse Result in 2021 Answer key, Cut off, Merit list

State public service commissions of India
Government agencies established in 1937
State agencies of Uttar Pradesh
Civil Services of Uttar Pradesh
Organisations based in Allahabad
1937 establishments in India